The FCA Giorgio Platform is an automobile platform made by Fiat Chrysler Automobiles since 2015 debuting in the Alfa Romeo Giulia. Following the merger with Groupe PSA to form Stellantis in 2021, the platform is anticipated to be phased out due to its inability to accommodate either hybrid plug-in or electric power plants, and will be replaced with the newer Giorgio Evo/STLA Large EV platform.

Vehicles based on Giorgio platform

References 

Alfa Romeo platforms